

See also
List of unsolved murders in the United Kingdom
Chris Clark, author and documentary-maker who focuses on unsolved murders
David Smith, convicted killer suspected of being responsible for other unsolved murders

References

Lists of victims of crimes
 
United Kingdom crime-related lists
Lists of events in the United Kingdom
United Kingdom unsolved